TYRO protein tyrosine kinase-binding protein is an adapter protein that in humans is encoded by the TYROBP gene.

Function 

This gene encodes a transmembrane signaling polypeptide which contains an immunoreceptor tyrosine-based activation motif (ITAM) in its cytoplasmic domain. The encoded protein may associate with the killer cell immunoglobulin-like receptor (KIR) family of membrane glycoproteins and may act as an activating signal transduction element. This protein may bind zeta-chain associated protein kinase 70 kDa (ZAP-70) and spleen tyrosine kinase (SYK) and play a role in signal transduction, bone modeling, brain myelination, and inflammation. Mutations within this gene have been associated with polycystic lipomembranous osteodysplasia with sclerosing leukoencephalopathy (PLOSL), also known as Nasu-Hakola disease. Its putative receptor, triggering receptor expressed on myeloid cells 2 (TREM2), also causes PLOSL. Two alternative transcript variants encoding distinct isoforms have been identified for this gene. Other alternative splice variants have been described, but their full-length nature has not been determined.

Interactions 

TYROBP has been shown to interact with SIRPB1.

Clinical significance
Pathological mutations of the TYROBP gene cause polycystic lipomembranous osteodysplasia with sclerosing leukoencephalopathy 1, a condition presenting as early-onset dementia.

References

External links 
  GeneReviews/NIH/NCBI/UW entry on Polycystic Lipomembranous Osteodysplasia with Sclerosing Leukoencephalopathy (PLOSL)

Further reading